Your Face Tomorrow, Volume 1: Fever and Spear is a 2002 novel by the Spanish writer Javier Marías. Margaret Jull Costa's English translation was published by New Directions in 2005. Costa won the coveted Valle- Inclán Award for this translation.

Plot
At a dinner at the home of his friend, retired Oxford professor Sir Peter Wheeler, the narrator, Deza, is introduced to Mr. Tupra.  Months later he is working for Tupra, giving his interpretations and analysis of the behavior and motivations of a wide range of people.  A flashback to the morning after the dinner reveals that Wheeler worked for MI6 during World War II, and that  Tupra does similar work.  In their conversation Wheeler tells Deza that the latter shows evidence of being one of the greatest and most perceptive personality analysts of his kind.

2002 novels
Novels by Javier Marías
21st-century Spanish novels
Alfaguara books